The 2017–18 UEFA Youth League UEFA Champions League Path (group stage) was played from 12 September to 6 December 2017. A total of 32 teams competed in the UEFA Champions League Path (group stage) to decide 16 of the 24 places in the knockout phase of the 2017–18 UEFA Youth League.

Draw

The youth teams of the 32 clubs which qualified for the 2017–18 UEFA Champions League group stage entered the UEFA Champions League Path. If there was a vacancy (youth teams not entering), it was filled by a team defined by UEFA.

For the UEFA Champions League Path, the 32 teams were drawn into eight groups of four. There was no separate draw held, with the group compositions identical to the draw for the 2017–18 UEFA Champions League group stage, which was held on 24 August 2017, 18:00 CEST, at the Grimaldi Forum in Monaco.

Format

In each group, teams played against each other home-and-away in a round-robin format. The eight group winners advanced to the round of 16, while the eight runners-up advanced to the play-offs, where they were joined by the eight second round winners from the Domestic Champions Path.

Tiebreakers

Teams were ranked according to points (3 points for a win, 1 point for a draw, 0 points for a loss), and if tied on points, the following tiebreaking criteria were applied, in the order given, to determine the rankings (Regulations Articles 14.03):
Points in head-to-head matches among tied teams;
Goal difference in head-to-head matches among tied teams;
Goals scored in head-to-head matches among tied teams;
Away goals scored in head-to-head matches among tied teams;
If more than two teams are tied, and after applying all head-to-head criteria above, a subset of teams are still tied, all head-to-head criteria above are reapplied exclusively to this subset of teams;
Goal difference in all group matches;
Goals scored in all group matches;
Away goals scored in all group matches;
Wins in all group matches;
Away wins in all group matches;
Disciplinary points (red card = 3 points, yellow card = 1 point, expulsion for two yellow cards in one match = 3 points);
Drawing of lots.

Groups

The matchdays were 12–13 September, 26–27 September, 17–18 October, 31 October – 1 November, 21–22 November, and 5–6 December 2017.

Times up to 28 October 2017 (matchdays 1–3) were CEST (UTC+2), thereafter (matchdays 4–6) times were CET (UTC+1).

Group A

Group B

Group C

Group D

Group E

Group F

Group G

Group H

Notes

References

External links
UEFA Youth League (official website)
UEFA Youth League history: 2017/18

1
September 2017 sports events in Europe
October 2017 sports events in Europe
November 2017 sports events in Europe
December 2017 sports events in Europe